The Thean Hou Temple (/樂聖嶺天后宮) is a six-tiered temple of the Chinese sea goddess Mazu located in Kuala Lumpur, Malaysia. It was completed in 1987 and officially opened in 1989. The temple was built by Hainanese living in Malaysia and the property belongs to and is run by the Selangor and Federal Territory Hainan Association (Malay:Hainan Selangor and Wilayah Persekutuan; Chinese:/雪隆海南會館). It is one of the largest temples in Southeast Asia.

History 
The Thean Hou Temple was constructed from 1981 and completed in 1987 at a cost of approximately RM7 million.
The following are some of the Hainanese people that contributed to the success in the completion of the Thean Hou Temple :-Robert Chow ( Architect), Lim Meng Swee ( Structural Engineer ), Goh T.K ( M&E Engineer ), Loong Yoke Phin ( President ), Heng Fook Kum, Wing Hong How, Tan Koon Swan, Tan Loon Swan, Foo Siang Foh, Loong Yeh May and to all Hainanese that donated money by purchasing part of the building ie columns and beams.

The installation dates of the Goddesses and Bodhisattva as follows:
 16 November 1985 — Tian Hou Niang Niang
 19 October 1986 — Guan Yin (Bodhisattva)
 16 November 1986 — Shui Wei Sheng Niang

The temple was officially opened on 3 September 1989. Guan Yin was first given the appellation of "Goddess of Mercy" or the Mercy Goddess by Jesuit missionaries or The Society of Jesus in China. In Buddhist scriptures, Guan Yin is recognized as Avalokitesvara, the Bodhisattva of Compassion.

Features

Architectural 
This syncretic temple with elements of Buddhism, Confucianism and Taoism is a grandiose structure and represents a successful combination of modern architectural techniques and authentic traditional design featuring imposing pillars, spectacular roofs, ornate carvings and intricate embellishments. Its grand architecture has made it as one of the tourist destination. The front entrance of the temple features a multi-arched gateway with red pillars, the colour symbolic of prosperity and good fortune. Souvenir stalls and a canteen are found on the first level. The second-level houses the multi-purpose hall while offices are located on the third level. The fourth level has three tiers and the prayer hall is located here.

Prayer hall 

The prayer hall houses three altars, each altar with a large statue of one particular deity or goddess. The altar on the right is dedicated to Guan Yin, the Goddess of Mercy. Tian Hou Niang Niang is in the centre while Shui Wei Sheng Niang (the Goddess of the Waterfront) is at the left. In the middle of the hall and between the altars are two pairs of Kau Cim oracles that can be used by visitors. Despite the dedication to Tian Hou, worship of Guan Yin is a recurrent theme at the temple.

External 
In addition to her altar in the prayer hall, there is a smaller statue of Guan Yin to the right of the hall, set amongst rocks and falling water. Here one can kneel and receive a blessing of water from the statue. Outside the temple at the entrance to the grounds, there is a larger statue, similarly set amongst rocks and falling water. Other features include a Chinese Medicinal Herbs Garden, a Wishing Well as well as a Tortoise Pond. There is also a large statue of the goddess opposite the temple, along with a collection of other large statues that include representations of the twelve animals of Chinese astrology.

Activities

Religious and cultural 
Activities such as the grand birthday celebrations for Goddess Tian Hou, Goddess Kuan Yin and the Goddess of the Waterfront are conducted at Thean Hou Temple. Buddhist activities include Buddhist chanting sessions and Wesak Day celebrations. Cultural activities include the annual Mid-Autumn Festival during the eighth lunar month and the Chinese New Year celebration. In 2019, the temple was allocated RM30,000 by the federal government to encourage them to hold more cultural events.

Others 
The temple also offers fortune-telling and marriage registration services and traditional Chinese exercise and martial arts activities such as qigong, tai chi and wushu classes are conducted at the temple compound.

References

External links 
 
 

Religious buildings and structures completed in 1987
Chinese-Malaysian culture in Kuala Lumpur
Buddhist temples in Malaysia
Confucian temples in Malaysia
Taoist temples in Malaysia
Religious buildings and structures in Kuala Lumpur
Guanyin temples
Mazu temples
20th-century Buddhist temples
20th-century Taoist temples
20th-century Confucian temples